Maximilian, Duke von Hohenberg (Maximilian Karl Franz Michael Hubert Anton Ignatius Joseph Maria; 29 September 1902 – 8 January 1962), was the elder son of Archduke Franz Ferdinand of Austria-Hungary and his wife Countess Sophie Chotek von Chotkowa und Wognin, Duchess von Hohenberg. Because his parents' marriage was morganatic, he was excluded from succession to the Austro-Hungarian throne, to which his father was heir presumptive, and to inheritance of any of his father's dynastic titles, income, and properties, although not from the archduke's personal estate nor from his mother's property.

Life

Maximilian was born on 29 September 1902 and baptized in Vienna two days later with Archduke Charles Stephen of Austria as sponsor. From birth he had the lesser princely title and the nobiliary particle von Hohenberg accorded his mother as a predicate at the time of her marriage, and in 1905 he shared with his siblings her receipt of the style "Serene Highness". Although Sophie had been raised from Princess (Fürstin) to Duchess (Herzogin) in 1909 by Emperor Franz Joseph, because that title was accorded ad personam, Maximilian did not inherit it upon her death in 1914. On 31 August 1917, however, Emperor Charles I granted him the dukedom on a hereditary basis, simultaneously raising his treatment from "Serene Highness" (Durchlaucht) to "Highness" (Hoheit).

In 1911, it was rumored among French circles that Germany planned to install Maximilian as Imperial Governor of Alsace-Lorraine.

Following the assassination of his parents in Sarajevo in 1914, which resulted in the outbreak of World War I, Maximilian, his sister, Princess Sophie and their brother, Prince Ernst, were initially taken in by their maternal aunt and uncle Marie and Jaroslav, Prince and Princess von Thun und Hohenstein, subsequently being raised in the care of their step-grandmother, Archduchess Maria-Theresa of Austria.

In 1919, following the defeat of the Austro-Hungarian Empire and collapse of the Habsburg monarchy, the new republic of Czechoslovakia expropriated Konopiště Castle, Maximilian's chief residence, and other family properties in the former Kingdom of Bohemia, and expelled the brothers to Austria. Subsequently, they lived in Vienna and at Artstetten Castle in Lower Austria. Maximilian obtained a law degree from the University of Graz in 1926. He managed the family properties and worked as a lawyer.

Because he had never been a dynast of the Austrian Imperial Family, he was neither banished nor had his properties expropriated under Austria's law of exile of 3 April 1919. Remaining in Vienna, by the 1930s the Duke became the leader within Austria of a significant movement for restoration of the monarchy and of his kinsman Otto von Habsburg to the former Imperial throne.

In March 1938, Austria became part of the German Reich as a result of the Anschluss. Having spoken out for the independence of Austria and against the Anschluss, Maximilian and his brother were arrested by the Reich authorities and interned in Dachau concentration camp, where they were chiefly employed in cleaning the latrines. According to Leopold Figl (who served as Chancellor of Austria after World War II), they did so cheerfully and maintained comradely relations with fellow prisoners. Maximilian was released after six months (Ernst was transferred to other concentration camps and released only in 1943) and was then compelled to stay at Artstetten Castle; the Reich authorities also expropriated the family's other properties in Austria.

After the liberation of Austria in 1945, the residents of Artstetten elected Maximilian as mayor, with the concurrence of the Soviet occupation authorities. He served two five-year terms as mayor.

Maximilian died on 8 January 1962 at the age of 59. He is buried in the crypt of the Hohenberg family's Artstetten Castle. His wife's remains are in a sarcophagus to his left. His eldest son, Franz, took the ducal title.

Marriage and issue
Maximilian married on 16 November 1926 in Wolfegg, Countess Maria Elisabeth Bona von Waldburg zu Wolfegg und Waldsee (10 August 1904 in Bad Waldsee – 13 March 1993 in Salzburg). They had six sons:
 Franz, Duke von Hohenberg (13 September 1927 – 16 August 1977) he married Princess Elisabeth of Luxembourg on 9 May 1956. They had two daughters. Their daughter Sophie has pursued restoration of ownership of Konopiště Castle, in the Czech Republic, on the grounds that the Hohenbergs were never recognized as members of the House of Habsburg, and therefore the provisions of Article 208 of the Treaty of Saint Germain, and Article 3 of Law no.354 of 1921 in Czechoslovakia, do not apply to them. 
Princess Anna (Anita) Charlotte Maximiliana Euphemia Maria Helena of Hohenberg (born 18 August 1958, Berg Castle). She married Romee de La Poeze, Count d'Harambure on 22 July 1978. They have four children. In 1998 they divorced and on 9 July 2005 she married Count Andreas von Bardeau. 
Princess Sophie Felicitas Elisabetha Bona Maria Antonia of Hohenberg (born 10 May 1960) married Jean-Louis de Potesta on 18 June 1983. They have three children. 
 Georg, Duke von Hohenberg (25 April 1929 at Artstetten Castle – 25 July 2019), married on 4 July 1960 in Vienna, Princess Eleonore of Auersperg-Breunner (12 September 1928 in Goldegg – 15 February 2021), daughter of Karl Alain, Prince of Auersperg-Breunner and Countess Marie Henriette von Meran. They have three children.
Prince Nikolaus von Hohenberg (b. 1961), current holder of the Duke of Hohenberg title, married Countess Marie Elizabeth von Westphalen (b. 1963), they have four children.
Prince Karl von Hohenberg
Princess Johanna von Hohenberg
Princess Teresa von Hohenberg
Princess Sophie von Hohenberg
Princess Henriette von Hohenberg (b. 1962)
Prince Maximilian von Hohenberg (b. 1970), married Maria Emilia Oliva Cattaneo Vietti (b. 1971), daughter of Cesare Oliva and Luisa Vietti Cattaneo. They have three children
Prince Nikolaus von Hohenberg
Princess Luisa von Hohenberg
Prince Leopold von Hohenberg
 Prince Albrecht von Hohenberg (4 February 1931 – 25 February 2021), married on 11 April 1962 in Vienna, Countess Leontine von Cassis-Faraone (born 3 August 1933), daughter of Count Leo August von Cassis-Faraone and Wilhelmina Fentener van Vlissingen. They have four children:
 Princess Margarete von Hohenberg (born 19 June 1963 in Vienna) she married on 28 December 1990, Archduke Joseph Karl of Austria (born 18 March 1960 in Feldafing), son of Archduke Joseph Árpád of Austria and Princess Maria of Löwenstein-Wertheim-Rosenberg. They have four children:
 Archduchess Johanna of Austria (born 21 May 1992 in London)
 Archduke Joseph Albrecht of Austria (born 26 July 1994 in Hanover)
 Archduke Paul Leo of Austria (born 13 January 1996 in Hanover)
 Archduchess Elisabeth of Austria (born 22 September 1997 in Hanover)
 Prince Leo von Hohenberg (born 28 September 1964 in Vienna), married on 3 September 1994 in Lisbon, Rosalind Roque da Cruz de Carvalho Alcoforado (born 3 July 1964 in New York City), daughter of Eugenio Mendes Belo Alcoforado and Roque da Cruz de Carvalho. They have two children:
 Princess Genevieve von Hohenberg (born 9 March 1998 in Vienna)
 Prince Adrien von Hohenberg (born 29 October 2003 in Vienna)
 Princess Johanna von Hohenberg (born 29 September 1966 in Vienna), married on 17 June 1995 in Strobl, Count Andreas Henckel von Donnersmarck (born 30 March 1959 at Schloss Berg), son of Count Karl Josef Henckel von Donnersmarck and Princess Marie Adelaide of Luxembourg. They have four children:
 Countess Laura Henckel von Donnersmarck (born 21 January 1997 in Wolfsberg)
 Countess Marie Henckel von Donnersmarck (born 15 August 1998 in Wolfsberg)
 Count Ludwig Henckel von Donnersmarck (born 25 May 2001 in Wolfsberg)
 Count Albrecht Henckel von Donnersmarck (born 27 March 2006 in Wolfsberg)
 Princess Katharina von Hohenberg (born 9 March 1969 in Vienna), married on 3 May 1997 in Strobl, Carlos Manuel Mendez de Vigo y Löwenstein-Wertheim-Rosenberg (born 27 July 1969 in Munich), son of Jaime Mendez de Vigo y del Arco and Princess Monika of Löwenstein-Wertheim-Rosenberg. They have six children:
 Emanuel Méndez de Vigo y Hohenberg (21 February 1999) 
 Fernando Javier Méndez de Vigo y Hohenberg (2000) 
 Livia Méndez de Vigo y Hohenberg (2002) 
 Alfonso Méndez de Vigo y Hohenberg (2003) 
 Clemente Méndez de Vigo y Hohenberg (2007) 
 Felipe Méndez de Vigo y Hohenberg (2009) 
 Prince Johannes von Hohenberg (3 May 1933 in Artstetten – 11 October 2003 in Salzburg), married on 28 August 1969, Elisabeth Meilinger zu Weyerhof-Rehrl (born 30 May 1947 in Salzburg), daughter of Franz Meilinger zu Weyerhof-Rehrl and Lily Diensthuber. They have four children:
 Princess Sophie von Hohenberg (born 26 May 1970 in Salzburg), married on 7 October 2006 in St. Gilgen, Clemens von Trauttenberg (born 23 November 1970 in Linz). They have issue.
 Prince Stephan von Hohenberg (born 3 July 1972 in Salzburg), married on 30 September 2000 in Salzburg, Leonie von Kloss (born 11 April 1977 in Salzburg), daughter of Johannes von Kloss and Veronica Hofmann. They have four children:
 Princess Philippa von Hohenberg (born 21 July 2001)
 Princess Antonia von Hohenberg (born 9 January 2003)
 Prince Johannes von Hohenberg (born 21 December 2005 in Salzburg)
 Princess Josepha von Hohenberg (born 23 September 2009)
 Prince Georg von Hohenberg (born 3 February 1975 in Salzburg), married on 8 October 2005 in Vienna, Valérie Hutter (born 26 March 1976 in Vienna)
 Princess Isabelle von Hohenberg (born 13 May 1976 in Salzburg), married on 12 September 2012 in Salzburg, Franziskus Bagusat (born 22 April 1982 in Starnberg). They have one son:
 Antonius Bagusat (born 2013) 
 Prince Peter von Hohenberg (26 March 1936 in Artstetten – 6 December 2017), married on 14 April 1970, Christine-Marie Meilinger zu Weyerhof-Rehrl (born 27 April 1945 in Salzburg), daughter of Franz Meilinger zu Weyerhof-Rehrl and Lily Diensthuber. They were divorced in 1980. They have two daughters:
 Princess Marie-Christine von Hohenberg (born 25 November 1970 in Salzburg)
 Princess Marie-Therese von Hohenberg (born 31 July 1972 in Salzburg), married on 29 September 2007, Anthony Bailey (born 13 January 1970 in London), son of Colin Bailey. They have one son:
 Maximilian Bailey (born 3 March 2010 in London)
 Prince Gerhard von Hohenberg (23 December 1941 in Vienna – 8 May 2019)

Honours
  Austro-Hungarian Imperial and Royal Family: Knight of the Order of the Golden Fleece, 1932

Ancestry

Notes

|-

1902 births
1962 deaths
20th-century Austrian people
Dukes of Austria
Chotek family
Hohenberg family
Knights of the Golden Fleece of Austria
Austrian people of Czech descent
People from Landstraße
Dachau concentration camp survivors
Austrian monarchists